
Listed below are executive orders and presidential proclamations signed by United States President George H. W. Bush. His executive orders and presidential proclamations are also listed on WikiSource.

Executive orders

1989

1990

1991

1993

See also
 List of executive actions by Ronald Reagan, EO #12287–12667 (1981–1989)
 List of executive actions by Bill Clinton, EO #12834–13197 (1993–2001)

References

External links
 Federal Archives
 Federal Register

 
United States federal policy
Executive orders of George H. W. Bush
George H. W. Bush-related lists